Manuel Larráinzar Piñero (26 December 1809 – 11 September 1884) was a Mexican conservative politician who served as minister of Justice in the cabinet of Interim President Miguel Miramón and as magistrate and counsellor of state to Emperor Maximilian of Mexico.

Works
 (1837).
 (1852).
 (1875).

Notes and references

1809 births
1884 deaths
Conservatism in Mexico
Mexican monarchists
Politicians from Chiapas
People from San Cristóbal de las Casas
Ambassadors of Mexico to the United States
Second French intervention in Mexico
19th-century Mexican politicians